Luca Fanfoni (born 1964 in Parma), is an Italian violinist.

Biography and awards 

He began the study of the violin in his native town at an early age with Giuseppe Alessandri and continued at the Giuseppe Verdi Conservatory in Milan with Gigino Maestri. At a very young age he won the first prize at the International Competition of Stresa, the first prize at the National Competition of Pescara and the first prize at the National Competition of Vittorio Veneto.

Luca Fanfoni studied for five years with Salvatore Accardo at the W. Stauffer Foundation of Cremona and during this last phase of improvement he participated in numerous International Competitions winning, in 1988, the first prize at the International Competition Romano Romanini and winning the International Competition Giovan-Batiste Viotti of Vercelli in 1987 and the Enrico Costa prize in 1989 at the International Competition Niccolò Paganini of Genoa.

Activity 

He actively performs on halls such as the Carnegie Hall in New York City, Anvers Philharmonie Hall, Kaikan Hall and Geijutsu Gekijo of Tokyo, Sala Verdi in Milan, Teatro Comunale of Bologna, Hochschule Music Hall of Vienna, Concerts Hall of the Lucerne Conservatory amongst others.

Luca Fanfoni is a violin professor at the Parma Conservatory Arrigo Boito.

Recordings 

He was a featured musician for the internet independent label OnClassical.

Male classical violinists
Italian classical violinists
1964 births
Living people
Paganini Competition prize-winners
21st-century classical violinists
21st-century Italian male musicians